The Federally Administered Tribal Areas cricket team (FATA) was a first-class cricket side who first competed in domestic cricket in Pakistan in the 2015–16 season. FATA entered the Quaid-e-Azam Trophy through a qualifying round. In their first ever first-class match, they drew with Habib Bank Limited cricket team in the 2015–16 Quaid-e-Azam Trophy. They won their first match in round 6 of the same edition of the tournament, when they defeated Rawalpindi by four wickets.

In August 2016 they took part in Pakistan's domestic Twenty20 cricket tournament, the 2016–17 National T20 Cup. In their first match, they beat Rawalpindi by 15 runs. In November 2017, they reached the semi-finals of the 2017–18 National T20 Cup, but lost to Lahore Blues by 10 runs.

References

External links
 Federally Administered Tribal Areas at CricketArchive
 Federally Administered Tribal Areas at Cricinfo

2015 establishments in Pakistan
Pakistani first-class cricket teams
Cricket clubs established in 2015
Cricket team